Nguyễn Hải Huy (born 18 June 1991) is a Vietnamese footballer who plays as a central midfielder for Hải Phòng.

References 

1991 births
Living people
Vietnamese footballers
Association football midfielders
V.League 1 players
Than Quang Ninh FC players
People from Quảng Ninh province